Dame Christine Ryan,  is a British teacher and public servant. Since August 2020, she has been Chair of the Office for Standards in Education, Children's Services and Skills (Ofsted). Having worked as a teacher between 1976 and 1993, she was then an Ofsted inspector from 1993 to 2009, and Chief Inspector and CEO of the Independent Schools Inspectorate from 2005 to 2017. Ryan is a co-founder of an education consultancy, Ryan and Grunsell.

References

Living people
Year of birth missing (living people)
British schoolteachers
Dames Commander of the Order of the British Empire
Fellows of the Royal Society of Biology